Ernest Leopold Hetthich (1897–1973) was an American scholar of classics.

Born in Brooklyn, N.Y., As the son of Dr. Leonhard Hettich and his wife Ella Elfriede Helene von Dobschütz. He is a graduate of the Brooklyn Boys High School.   He graduated from Cornell University in 1919. He earned an M.A. from Cornell in 1920 and worked for seven years at the New York Public Library. In 1933 he  earned his PhD at Columbia University. Hettich joined the  faculty of New York University in 1927 as Professor of Classics, taught there for many years, and served as Director of Libraries.

From 1943 - 1947 he served as director of training for the United States Army, specialist training program, foreign area and language section at New York University.

He was author of the widely used textbook, Latin fundamentals (Prentice Hall), and A study in ancient nationalism: the testimony of Eurípides (Bayard Presse, 1933)

His brother was Prof. Dr. Karl Hettich. He had one son, Bedrich V. Hettich (1922-2012).

References

External references
 

Scholars of nationalism
New York University faculty
Cornell University alumni
Columbia University faculty
1973 deaths
1897 births